is a 1981 scrolling shooter platform game developed by Alpha Denshi under contract for Hoei Corporation. It was distributed in arcades by Sega in Japan and Europe, and by Rock-Ola in North America. It was the first platform game to include horizontal and, in one segment, vertical scrolling. Jump Bug was ported to the Arcadia 2001, Leisure Vision, and PC-98 home systems.

The game uses a limited form of parallax scrolling, with the main scene scrolling while starry night sky is fixed and clouds move slowly, adding depth to the scenery. This was a year before Moon Patrol (1982), with its three moving layers.

Gameplay
The player controls a constantly bouncing car, which resembles a Volkswagen Beetle (or "bug"), driving through a city, mountains, pyramid, and underwater. The height of the jump and speed of a fall are controlled with the joystick. The player can shoot various enemies that appear. Points are gained by collecting treasure, killing enemies, and jumping on clouds. Each treasure collected adds to a meter; an extra life the first time it is filled.

The game smoothly scrolls as the player's car moves to the right, but in the pyramid segment the game also scrolls vertically in a coarser manner. Here the player is able to move in any direction, including to the left, while looking for the exit.

Reception
In Japan, Jump Bug was tied with Scramble and Space Panic as the 14th highest-grossing 1981.

Notes

References

External links
Jump Bug at Arcade History

1981 video games
Arcade video games
Platform games
NEC PC-9801 games
Scrolling shooters
Sega arcade games
Video games developed in Japan
Banpresto games
ADK (company) games